The 1975–76 Washington State Cougars men's basketball team represented Washington State University for the 1975–76 NCAA Division I men's basketball season. Led by fourth-year head coach George Raveling, the Cougars were members of the Pacific-8 Conference and played their home games on campus at the Performing Arts Coliseum in Pullman, Washington.

On Wednesday, January 21, WSU met Palouse neighbor Idaho in the inaugural varsity basketball game in the recently enclosed Kibbie Dome in Moscow. The festivities included an alumni game, featuring Idaho great Gus Johnson, won by  Washington State. The varsity Cougars also won the main event, 84–67, before 6,449 spectators, which easily set a campus attendance record for basketball that stood for five years.

References

External links
Sports Reference – Washington State Cougars: 1975–76 basketball season

Washington State Cougars men's basketball seasons
Washington State Cougars
Washington State
Washington State